There are at least 14 named lakes and reservoirs in Greene County, Arkansas.

Lakes
 Little Lake, el.  
 Swagger Slough, el.

Reservoirs
 Arnolds Lake, el.  
 Big Creek Site 15 Reservoir, el.  
 Big Creek Site One Reservoir, el.  
 Big Creek Site Three Reservoir, el.  
 Dickeys Lake, el.  
 Lake Ashbaugh, el.  
 Lake Frierson, el.  
 Meadow Lake, el.  
 Reynolds Park Lake, el.  
 Thompson Lake, el.  
 W.H. Spence Lake, el.  
 Walcot Lake, el.

See also

 List of lakes in Arkansas

Notes

Bodies of water of Greene County, Arkansas
Greene